Vincent Franklin Glionna (February 4, 1906 – October 31, 1973) was a Canadian boxer who competed in the 1928 Summer Olympics. He was born in Toronto, Ontario.

In 1928, he was eliminated in the quarter-finals of the bantamweight class after losing his fight to the eventual bronze medalist Harry Isaacs of South Africa.

External links
Vince Glionna's profile at Sports Reference.com

1906 births
1973 deaths
Bantamweight boxers
Olympic boxers of Canada
Boxers at the 1928 Summer Olympics
Boxers from Toronto
Canadian male boxers